"Unbelievable" is a song written by Jimmy Jansson, Micha Wilshire, and Lori Wilshire. It was performed by Lisa Ajax in the finals of Idol 2014 as the winner-song.

Charts

References

2014 singles
2014 songs
Songs written by Jimmy Jansson